Susan Louisa Moir Allison (August 18, 1845 – February 1, 1937) was a Canadian author and pioneer. In 2010 Allison was designated a National Historic Person by the Canadian Government.

Early life and education 
Susan Louisa Moir was born on August 18, 1845 in Ceylon, where her father owned a tea plantation. When Susan's father died, her family, consisting of her mother, sister and brother, relocated to England, where she was educated. In 1857, Susan's mother remarried, this time to Thomas Glennie, a Scotsman. In 1860, when Susan was 14, Glennie moved the family to Hope, British Columbia. However, in 1864, Susan's stepfather deserted his new family, leaving her to work as a governess. Using this experience, Susan established Hope's first school with her mother, and subsequently married John Fall Allison, one of the founders of what is now Princeton, British Columbia, in 1868.

Similkameen Valley 
After their marriage, the Allisons moved to the Similkameen Valley, becoming the first non-Aboriginal settlers to live there. The couple, aided by John's knowledge of Chinook Jargon, a trade language, as a result of his previous marriage to an Aboriginal woman, became close with nearby Aboriginal populations. There, the two produced 14 children. In the Valley, Allison had what she described as her happiest days, traversing nearby mountains on horseback and establishing relationships with nearby First Nations. Allison claimed to have sighted Ogopogo, a cryptid lake monster similar to the Loch Ness Monster in Okanagan Lake.

In 1891, an ethnographic paper of Allison's was published by the British Association for the Advancement of Science, and another in the Journal of the Royal Anthropological Institute of Great Britain and Ireland. In 1900 she published a poem about an Aboriginal chief.

Later life
In her final years she was forced to gradually return to urban life, first moving back to Hope and then to Vancouver in 1928, where she died on February 1, 1937. Her memoirs, partially published in The Province in 1931, were edited and republished by the University of British Columbia Press in 1976 as A Pioneer Gentlewoman in British Columbia: The Recollections of Susan Allison, 39 years after her death. On September 4, 2010, Allison was designated a National Historic Person by Jim Prentice, the Government of Canada's Minister for the Environment and Minister responsible for Parks Canada.

References 

1845 births
1937 deaths
Persons of National Historic Significance (Canada)
People from British Ceylon
Writers from Vancouver
Sri Lankan people of Canadian descent
Canadian memoirists
British emigrants to pre-Confederation British Columbia
Canadian women memoirists
People from the Fraser Valley Regional District
People from Princeton, British Columbia